Ihering's snake (Lioheterophis iheringi) is a snake endemic to Brazil. It is the only species in the monotypic genus Lioheterophis.

References 

Dipsadinae
Reptiles described in 1935
Reptiles of Brazil
Snakes of South America
Species known from a single specimen